Hõbeda may refer to several places in Estonia:

Hõbeda, Lääne-Viru County, village in Kadrina Parish, Lääne-Viru County
Hõbeda, Pärnu County, village in Koonga Parish, Pärnu County